Nobody's Wife is a 1918 American silent drama film directed by Edward LeSaint and starring Jack Hoxie, Louise Lovely and Alfred Allen.

Cast
 Jack Hoxie as Jack Darling 
 Louise Lovely as Hope Ross
 Alfred Allen as Sheriff Carew, aka Alec Young
 Betty Schade as Dancing Pete
 A.G. Kenyon as Tom Smythe
 Grace McLean as Betty Smythe

References

Bibliography
 Rainey, Buck. Sweethearts of the Sage: Biographies and Filmographies of 258 actresses appearing in Western movies. McFarland & Company, 1992.

External links
 

1918 films
1918 adventure films
American silent feature films
American adventure films
American black-and-white films
Universal Pictures films
Films directed by Edward LeSaint
1910s English-language films
1910s American films
Silent adventure films